Andrew, son of Serafin (died 11 April 1241) was a Hungarian baron and landowner, who held several secular positions during the reign of kings Andrew II and Béla IV.

His influence arose during the reign of Andrew II. He was a supporter of prince Béla, thus he held functions in the princely court. He served as master of the stewards for Béla twice, in 1225 and from 1231 to 1233. According to László Markó, he was the ispán (comes) of Borsod County in 1230. He was the last voivode for Andrew II in 1235, when Béla held the title of duke of Transylvania. After Béla IV ascended the throne in 1235, he was replaced by Pousa, son of Sólyom. Andrew functioned as ispán of Pozsony County between 1235 and 1240 (or 1241).

In 1239, he was nominated judge royal by Béla IV. He was killed in the Battle of Mohi on 11 April 1241 and later replaced by Paul Geregye.

References

Sources
 Engel, Pál (2001). The Realm of St Stephen: A History of Medieval Hungary, 895–1526. I.B. Tauris Publishers. .
  Markó, László (2006). A magyar állam főméltóságai Szent Istvántól napjainkig – Életrajzi Lexikon ("The High Officers of the Hungarian State from Saint Stephen to the Present Days – A Biographical Encyclopedia") (2nd edition); Helikon Kiadó Kft., Budapest; .
  Zsoldos, Attila (2011). Magyarország világi archontológiája, 1000–1301 ("Secular Archontology of Hungary, 1000–1301"). História, MTA Történettudományi Intézete. Budapest. 

1241 deaths
Judges royal
Voivodes of Transylvania
Hungarian military personnel killed in the Mongol invasion of Europe
Year of birth unknown
13th-century Hungarian people